Crystal Growth & Design is a monthly peer-reviewed scientific journal published by the American Chemical Society. It was established in January 2001 as a bimonthly journal and changed to a monthly frequency in 2006. The editor-in-chief is Jonathan W. Steed from Durham University.

Aims and scope
The focus of the journal is theory and experimentation pertaining to the design, growth, and application of crystalline materials. Processes involved in achieving the various stages of development are also covered. Included in this focus is the physical, chemical, and biological properties of these materials, and how these impact the process. Fundamental research, which contributes to these areas, is also part of the scope of this journal. The intended audience is scientists and engineers working in the fields of crystal growth, crystal engineering, and the industrial application of crystalline materials.

Abstracting and indexing
The journal is indexed in Science Citation Index, Current Contents/Physical, Chemical & Earth Sciences, Scopus, EBSCOhost, and Chemical Abstracts Service/CASSI.

Most cited articles 
The most cited recent articles are:

References

American Chemical Society academic journals
Publications established in 2001
Monthly journals
English-language journals
Crystallography journals